Paul Lyneham (13 August 1945 – 24 November 2000) was an Australian newspaper journalist, commentator and radio and television presenter.

Biography
Lyneham was born in Melbourne in 1945, growing up there and in Canberra where he graduated from the Australian National University. During his time as a student he was the lead vocalist in the band The Bitter Lemons which recorded the independently released single "Canberra Blues" in 1965.

He worked as a journalist at The Australian and The Canberra Times newspapers before joining the ABC in 1969 and spending a period of time as London, UK correspondent. Whilst in London, Lyneham met the author Dorothy Horsfield, with whom he went on to have three children. Lyneham joined commercial television, working for Channel Seven as a foreign correspondent including reporting on the Falklands War. After returning to Australia Lyneham worked on Sydney radio station 2BL with his close friend Andrew Olle. He also reported for The 7.30 Report before joining Channel Nine and 60 Minutes.

Death 
Lyneham died of lung cancer on 24 November 2000 at Canberra. On 20 February 2002 then-Federal Treasurer Peter Costello launched the biography of Lyneham, Paul Lyneham – A Memoir, written by his widow Dorothy Horsfield, at the National Press Club, Canberra. Annually since 2002, the National Press Club has also awarded the Paul Lyneham Award for excellence in journalism with only members of the federal parliamentary press gallery being eligible for the award.

References

1945 births
2000 deaths
Australian National University alumni
Deaths from cancer in the Australian Capital Territory
Deaths from lung cancer
Australian television presenters
60 Minutes (Australian TV program) correspondents
Australian expatriates in the United Kingdom
20th-century Australian journalists